Malia or Mallia may refer to:

Places
 Malia, Crete, a town on the north coast of Crete
 Malia, Cyprus, a village in southern Cyprus
 Malia, Iran, a village
 Malia, a taluk(a) (administrative division) in Junagadh district, Gujarat, India
 Malia, an ancient name of Cape Agrilia, a cape on the island of Lesbos, Greece

People

Historical
 Mallia gens, a plebeian family of ancient Rome

Surname
 Emmanuel Mallia, a Maltese politician
 Francisco Jesús Pérez Malia or Francis (born 1981), Spanish footballer
 George Mallia (born 1978), a professional Maltese footballer
 Gorg Mallia (born 1957), a Maltese communications academic, author and cartoonist
 Liz Malia (born 1949), American politician 
 Luca Mallia, a Maltese footballer
 Martin Malia (1924–2004), American historian specializing in Russian history
 Mitchell Mallia (born 1992 in New South Wales), an Australian footballer

Given name
 Mallia Franklin (1952–2010), a vocalist with Parliament-Funkadelic
 Malia Hosaka (born 1969), American professional wrestler
Malia Johnston, New Zealand choreographer and dance director
 Malia Jones (born 1977), American model and surfer
 Malia Scotch Marmo, American screenwriter
 Malia Metella (born 1982), French Olympian swimmer
 Malia Obama (born 1998), daughter of former U.S. President Barack Obama
 Malia Pyles (born 2000), American actress
 Malia (model) (born 1983), Japanese fashion model
 Malia (singer) (born 1978), Malawian vocalist
Malia (American musician), American singer-songwriter

Other uses
 Malians (Greek tribe), in Ancient Greece
 Malia (bird), a passerine bird endemic to Sulawesi
 Malia (canoe), a Hawaiian-style wooden racing canoe
 "Malìa" (song), an 1887 song by Paolo Tosti
 Malìa (film), 1946 film directed by Giuseppe Amato
 Malta Library and Information Association (MaLIA), a member of the International Federation of Library Associations

See also
 Hawaiian name
 Malea (disambiguation)
 Maleia, a river in Romania
 Malian (disambiguation)
 Maliya, the Hittite goddess of gardens